The Encyclopedia of Fantasy is a 1997 reference work concerning fantasy fiction, edited by John Clute and John Grant. Other contributors include Mike Ashley, Neil Gaiman, Diana Wynne Jones, David Langford, Sam J. Lundwall, Michael Scott Rohan, Brian Stableford and Lisa Tuttle.
 
The book was well-received on publication. During 1998, it received the Hugo Award, World Fantasy Award, and Locus Award. The industry publication Library Journal described The Encyclopedia of Fantasy as "the first of its kind".

Since November 2012, the full text of The Encyclopedia of Fantasy is available on-line, as a companion to the on-line edition of The Encyclopedia of Science Fiction. The editors of The Encyclopedia of Science Fiction have stated that there are not any plans to update The Encyclopedia of Fantasy, at least for the foreseeable future, although some death dates post-1997 have been added. However, author and theme entries in The Encyclopedia of Science Fiction often borrow terminology from entries in The Encyclopedia of Fantasy.

Format and content
The Encyclopedia was published in a format that matches the 1993 second edition of The Encyclopedia of Science Fiction. It is slightly smaller in terms of content, containing 1,049 alphabetical pages, over 4,000 entries and approximately one million words, the bulk of which were written by Clute, Grant and Ashley. A later CD-ROM edition contains numerous revisions.

The Encyclopedia uses a similar system of categorization to The Encyclopedia of Science Fiction, but does not include an index of theme entries. A theme index was later included in the on-line addenda: see "External links" below. One of the major differences is that there are no entries related to publishing.

Neologisms
The Encyclopedia often invented new terms for theme entries, rather than using headings that may have previously appeared in critical literature. Examples include:

 Instauration Fantasy: a story in which the real world is transformed; the authors cite Little, Big (1981) by John Crowley as the first full-fledged example.
 Thinning: the gradual loss or decay of magic or vitality, as when the Elves depart from Middle-earth in The Lord of the Rings. In many novels by Tim Powers, denizens of the 20th century can work magic, but not as easily as could be done in earlier centuries.
 Wainscots: secret societies hiding from the mainstream of society, as in Mary Norton's The Borrowers.
 Water Margins: shifting or ill-defined boundaries used as both a physical description and a metaphor; derived from the Japanese television adaptation of The Water Margin.
 Polder: defined as "enclaves of toughened reality demarcated by boundaries" that are entered by crossing a threshold. Shangri-La is an example, as is Medwyn's valley in The Book of Three by Lloyd Alexander. 
 Crosshatch: A situation where the demarcation line between two realities is blurred and "two or more worlds may simultaneously inhabit the same territory"—such as in William Shakespeare's A Midsummer Night's Dream.
 Taproot texts: examples of fantasy literature that predates the emergence of fantasy as a genre in the late 18th century, such as Shakespeare's The Tempest.
 Pariah elite: a marginalized but uniquely talented or knowledgeable minority.
 Into the woods: the process of transformation or passage into a new world signalled by entering woods or forests.
 Wrongness: the growing awareness that something is "wrong" in the world, such as when the Hobbits first glimpse the Nazgûl in The Lord of the Rings.
Slick Fantasy: a style of Fantasy writing which uses certain specific themes: typically a Pact with the Devil; three wishes; or identity exchange. So named because these were the fantasy stories mostly likely to be published by slick magazines, as opposed to pulp magazines.

Reception

Characterizing the book as "an excellent and highly readable source for fantasy", the industry publication Library Journal described The Encyclopedia of Fantasy as "the first of its kind".

Awards
 1998 – Hugo Award for Best Non-Fiction Book.
 1998 – World Fantasy Special Award: Professional.
 1998 – Locus Award for Nonfiction.

Editions
 Clute, John and Grant, John. The Encyclopedia of Fantasy (1st UK edition). London: Orbit Books, 1997. . (Hardcover)
 Clute, John and Grant, John. The Encyclopedia of Fantasy. New York: St Martin's Press, 1997. . (Hardcover)
 Clute, John and Grant, John. The Encyclopedia of Fantasy (2nd US edition). New York: St Martin's Griffin, 1999. . (Paperback)

See also 
 The Encyclopedia of Science Fiction
 The Encyclopedia of Science Fiction and Fantasy
 The Greenwood Encyclopedia of Science Fiction and Fantasy

References

External links 
 On-line text of The Encyclopedia of Fantasy
 Addenda to The Encyclopedia of Fantasy—includes list of themes
 Review by Wayne G. Hammond
 Review by Steven H. Silver

1997 books
20th-century encyclopedias
21st-century encyclopedias
British encyclopedias
British online encyclopedias
Encyclopedias of literature
Fantasy books
Hugo Award for Best Non-Fiction Book winning works
Science fiction studies